The Tax Court of Canada Act was a 1983 Act of the Parliament of Canada concerning the Tax Court of Canada.

External links
 Canadian Department of Justice - Tax Court of Canada Act

Canadian federal legislation
Taxation in Canada
Tax legislation
Canadian law articles needing infoboxes
1983 in Canadian law